The 1977 World Modern Pentathlon Championships were held in San Antonio, United States.

Medal summary

Men's events

Medal table

See also
 World Modern Pentathlon Championship

References

 Sport123

Modern pentathlon in North America
World Modern Pentathlon Championships, 1977
World Modern Pentathlon Championships, 1977
International sports competitions hosted by the United States
World Modern Pentathlon Championships
Sports competitions in San Antonio
International sports competitions in Texas
Multisports in the United States